Sherrie May Arzú Beans (born 1 May 2002) is a Honduran footballer who plays as a goalkeeper for Xelajú and the Honduras women's national team.

Club career

Sacachispas 
In December 2017, Arzú helped Sacachispas to win the 2017 Apertura of the National Women's Football League of Guatemala in a 4–0 aggregate victory over Unifut Rosal.

Club Xelajú MC
In April 2021, Arzú signed with Club Xelajú MC. The following June, she played in the final as the team won the 2021 Clausura of the National Women's Football League of Guatemala.

In June 2022, Arzú spoke out against racist insults directed at her during Xelajú's semi-final clash with Unifut Rosal. The latter club was subsequently fined by the league.

Honours 
Sacachispas
 Liga Nacional de Fútbol Femenino de Guatemala: 2017 Apertura

Club Xelajú MC
 Liga Nacional de Fútbol Femenino de Guatemala: 2021 Clausura

References

1991 births
Living people
Honduran women's footballers
Women's association football goalkeepers
Honduran expatriate sportspeople in Guatemala